Argopistes is a genus of flea beetles in the family Chrysomelidae. There are about 50 described species in Argopistes. They are found worldwide.

Selected species

 Argopistes coccinea (Montrouzier, 1861)
 Argopistes coccinelliformis Csiki, 1940
 Argopistes coccinelloides Suffrian
 Argopistes coronatus Blake
 Argopistes dichroa (Montrouzier, 1861)
 Argopistes gagates (Montrouzier, 1861)
 Argopistes gourvesi Samuelson, 1979
 Argopistes kraussi Samuelson, 1973
 Argopistes rubicundus Blake
 Argopistes scyrtoides J. L. LeConte, 1878
 Argopistes thomassini (Montrouzier, 1861)
 Argopistes turnbowi
 Argopistes variabilis Medvedev
 Argopistes woodleyi

References

Further reading

 

Alticini
Chrysomelidae genera
Articles created by Qbugbot
Taxa named by Victor Motschulsky